Mythologies is the first studio album by American country/rock band performer, Rhett Miller, who later became the lead singer and songwriter of the Old 97's.  Miller recorded the album with friend, and future Old 97's bassist, Murry Hammond. His next solo effort would wait more than a decade.

Track listing
"Iron Child" – 2:40
"Days Between Stations" – 2:44
"Song for Truman Capote" – 3:32
"Fishbowl" – 2:26
"Still They Sing" – 4:28
"Redbird Song" – 4:12
"Cicada Song" – 4:07
"Honey in My Tea" – 3:45
"I'm Coming Home" – 3:19
"Sea Shell Girl" – 4:07
"Candy Apple Corkscrew Hair" – 1:57
"Staten Island Ferry Boat" – 2:32
"Between Timid and Timbuktu" – 2:09

References

Rhett Miller albums
1989 debut albums